2XMM J083026+524133 (2XMM J0830) is a very large galaxy cluster that lies 7.7 billion light-years away. It was discovered by chance by ESA's XMM Newton and the Large Binocular Telescope (LBT) in Arizona in 2008 while it was looking at the quasar APM 08279+5255.

As of 2008, it was the largest known galaxy cluster at red shift z ≧ 1, weighing in at an estimated 1015 solar masses. However,  galaxy cluster XMMXCS 2215-1738 is several billion light years farther away.

References

See also
 Galaxy cluster
 XMM Newton
 XMM Cluster Survey (XCS)

Galaxy clusters
Lynx (constellation)